Fateh is a coastal submarine of the Islamic Republic of Iran Navy, and the lead ship of her class. She was commissioned into the Southern Fleet on 17 February 2019 at Bostanu shipyard, Bandar Abbass, and bestowed by Iranian President Hassan Rouhani.

Construction 
Fateh was launched in 2016, according to Sebastien Roblin. However, H. I. Sutton says Fateh was launched in September 2013 with the hull number 961, before being changed to 920. Iran had announced that it will soon launch an indigenous submarine on 4 December 2016.

Description 
Jeremy Binnie of Jane's commented that based on released imagery, the submarine is equipped with retractable sensors such as an electro-optical mast and an optical periscope, as well as radar and electronic intelligence sensors. The propulsion system of Fateh was covered and is unknown. Four 533 mm torpedo tubes were seen on her bow.

Iranian sources wrote that she is armed with torpedoes, AShM cruise missiles and naval mines that could be fired when submerged. According to Caleb Larson, Fateh is likely able to fire Jask-2 missiles.

Service history 
Fateh was first seen on action during Joint Exercise Zolfaghar 99, held in September 2020. It was first fired torpedoes during Eqtedar (Power)-99 naval exercise, held in January 2021.

See also 

 List of current ships of the Islamic Republic of Iran Navy

References 

Submarines of Iran
Submarines of the Islamic Republic of Iran Navy
2019 ships
Ships built at Shahid Darvishi shipyard